Calypso Theme Waterpark is a waterpark located in Limoges, Ontario, Canada, about  east of Ottawa. The park opened to the public on June 7, 2010.

The park features 35 waterslides, a wave pool (the largest in Canada) and two lazy rivers as well as a food outlets, shops, picnic areas, and a VIP area with private cabanas and suites.

The park can accommodate 22,000 visitors per day. On average, the park receives 400,000 visitors each season.

Attractions 
 Accelerators; 4 tube slides
 Blue Rocket
 Orange Bobsleigh
 Stroboscope
 Toboggan Alley
 Adrenaline; a speed slide.
 Aqualoops; 2 AquaLoop slides
 Blackhole; a tube slide.
 Boomerango; a half-pipe rafting slide.
 Calypso Palace; a wave pool.
 Canyon Rafting; a rafting slide.
 Family Twisters; 4 body slides
 Aquashake
 Mellow Yellow
 Pigtail
 Twist & Shout
 Fast Track; a multi-lane racer slide.
 Funtana; a splash pad.
 Jungle Challenge; an obstacle course.
 Jungle Run; a lazy river.
 Kongo Expedition; a lazy river.
 Pirate's Aquaplay; a water play structure.
 Turbo Lab; 4 bowl slides.
 Acid Test; tube slide
 Frosty Drop; body slide
 Hot Dip; body slide
 Steamer; tube slide
 Turbulence; a tube slide.
 Vertigo; a speed slide.
 Zoo Lagoon; a children's play area with small slides.
 Zoomerang; a half-pipe tube slide.

Safety violations
During a one-month period in the summer of 2011, there were 10 injuries on Steamer, two of which resulted in spinal injuries. In all cases, the park failed to shut down the ride and did not report the incidents until the end of the season in September.

On June 19, 2012, employees on Orange Bobsleigh prematurely sent a group of riders down the slide resulting in a collision between two tubes causing a rider to be thrown out of the slide onto to the concrete below, knocking him unconscious.

In August 2012, an excess amount of chlorine was discharge into Calypso Palace sickening 20 people, 13 of whom had to be taken to hospital. Later that day, a power outage caused another discharge of chlorine into the pool, resulting in two more hospitalizations.

On April 13, 2015, Calypso Park was found guilty of six of the eleven charges it faced under Ontario's Technical Standards and Safety Act. They were fined $400,000 and forced to pay an additional $100,000 victim surcharge.

References

External links
 http://www.calypsopark.com/
 http://www.valcartier.com
 https://web.archive.org/web/20110315013042/http://www.calypsopark.com/about-the-park/10-new-waterslides/
 https://web.archive.org/web/20161221085856/https://www.ottawatourism.ca/wp-content/uploads/2015/02/2014-04-24-EMBARGOED-Ottawa-Tourism-Awards-eng.pdf
 http://www.tripadvisor.ca/TravelersChoice-Attractions-cWaterparks-g154449

Water parks in Canada
Buildings and structures in the United Counties of Prescott and Russell
2010 establishments in Ontario
Tourist attractions in the United Counties of Prescott and Russell